Hamide Kurt Doğangün (born Hamide Kurt, December 25, 1993) is a Turkish Paralympian athlete competing in the T53 disability class sprint events of 100m and 400m, T52/T53 class middle-distance event of 800m as well as T53/T54 class 4 × 400 m relay event.

Early years
Hamide Kurt was born in Istanbul, Turkey on December 25, 1993. At the age of nine, she had a traffic accident in Istanbul. After nearly two years of treatment in a hospital, she lost the ability to walk, and became reliant on a wheelchair.

Sporting career
Hamide Kurt began her sporting career in wheelchair basketball at Bağcılar Belediye SK in Istanbul. After realizing that she is not good in this sport branch, she switched over to the para-athletics in the same club.

In 2008, she took part at the Turkish Para-athletics Championships, and her success led to her admission to the national team.

Kurt captured the gold medal in the 200m T34/52/53 event at the 2012 IPC Athletics European Championships held in Stadskanaal, Netherlands.

She won the silver medal in the 100m T53 event at the 2015 IPC Athletics World Championships in Doha, Qatar. She set an area record with her time of 17.10 seconds.

At the 8th FAZAA leg of the IPC Athletics 2016 Grand Prix in Dubai, United Arab Emirates, which was a 2016 Paralympics qualifier, she won the silver medal in the 100m T53 event with 17.43.

Kurt represented her country at the 2016 Paralympics in Rio de Janeiro, Brazil. She finished the 400m T53 event sixth. She became European champion in the 200m T53 event at the  2018 IPC Athletics European Championships in Berlin, Germany running in 31.59.

She won the bronze medal at the 2019 World Para Athletics Championships – Women's 400 metres event in Dubai, United Arab Emirates. She qualified for the 2020 Summer Paralympics. She took the silver medal in the 100m T53 event of the 2021 World Para Athletics European Championships in Bydgoszcz, Poland.  She won further the silver medal in the 400m T53 event in the same championship. She won her third silver medal in the 800m T53 event.

References

1993 births
Living people
Sportspeople from Istanbul
Female competitors in athletics with disabilities
Turkish female wheelchair racers
Turkish female sprinters
Turkish female middle-distance runners
People with paraplegia
Paralympic athletes of Turkey
Wheelchair category Paralympic competitors
Athletes (track and field) at the 2016 Summer Paralympics
Medalists at the World Para Athletics European Championships
Medalists at the World Para Athletics Championships
Athletes (track and field) at the 2020 Summer Paralympics